The 1898 Kansas Jayhawks football team represented the University of Kansas as an independent during the 1898 college football season. In their second and final season under head coach Wylie G. Woodruff, the Jayhawks compiled a 7–1 record, shut out six of eight opponents, and outscored all opponents by a combined total of 129 to 24. The Jayhawks played their home games at McCook Field in Lawrence, Kansas. Arthur Mosse was the team captain.

Schedule

References

Kansas
Kansas Jayhawks football seasons
Kansas Jayhawks football